Little Esther is an album by American jazz pianist Horace Parlan featuring performances recorded in 1987 and released on the Italian-based Soul Note label.

Reception
The Allmusic review by Scott Yanow awarded the album 4 stars stating "straight-ahead but reasonably adventurous. A fine effort".

Track listing
All Compositions by Horace Parlan except as indicated
 "Little Esther" - 7:48  
 "Opus 16a" - 6:52  
 "Snow Girl" (Per Goldschmidt) - 7:20  
 "Arrival" - 6:33  
 "Something for Silver" - 7:58  
 "Precious Lady" (Goldschmidt) - 8:38  
 "T for Jazz" (Klavs Hovman) - 8:23

Personnel
Horace Parlan - piano 
Per Goldschmidt - baritone saxophone
Klavs Hovman - bass
Massimo de Majo - drums

References

Black Saint/Soul Note albums
Horace Parlan albums
1987 albums